Julia H. Tashjian (June 8, 1938 – May 9, 2013) was an American politician.

Born in Pawtucket, Rhode Island, Tashjian moved with her family to Connecticut and went to school in Hartford, Connecticut. She lived in Windsor, Connecticut from 1966 until her death. Tashjian was a member of the Democratic Party. Tashjian served as the Secretary of State of Connecticut from 1983 to 1991, losing her 1990 reelection campaign to Republican Party nominee Pauline R. Kezer. Tashjian ran again for Secretary of State in 1994 but lost the Democratic primary to Miles S. Rapoport.

References 

1938 births
2013 deaths
American people of Armenian descent
Politicians from Pawtucket, Rhode Island
People from Windsor, Connecticut
Connecticut Democrats
Women in Connecticut politics
Secretaries of the State of Connecticut
Armenian American
Ethnic Armenian politicians
21st-century American women